Drimys andina is a species of flowering plant in family Winteraceae. It is native to Chile and Argentina in southern South America.

Description
Drimys andina is an evergreen shrub, which grows from .5 to one meter tall and as broad. The leaves are long, oval, and leathery. It flowers in summer, with white, star-shaped scented flowers growing in terminal clusters.

Range and habitat
Drimys andina is native to central and southern Chile and southern Argentina. It is found in sub-alpine and sub-antarctic forests from 37°43’ to 41°34’ south latitude.

References

andina
Flora of South Argentina
Flora of central Chile
Flora of southern Chile